Matusevich Fjord (Fiord Matusevicha), is a fjord in Severnaya Zemlya, Krasnoyarsk Krai, Russia.

This fjord is blocked by heavy ice the whole year round. Its iceberg-producing activity is unmatched by other fjords of Severnaya Zemlya.

History
Matusevich Fjord was first put in the map at the time of the 1931 expedition led by Soviet researchers Georgy Ushakov and Nikolay Urvantsev that explored for the first time Severnaya Zemlya. More accurate cartographic work of the fjord area was carried out by the 1950 expedition led by B.V. Zubov and A.I. Stepanov using aerial photography.

The fjord was named in honor of Nikolai Matusevich, a prominent researcher of the Soviet Arctic.

Geography
Matusevich Fjord is a fjord has its mouth in the northeastern area of October Revolution Island, west of Cape Figurny on the Laptev Sea shore of the island. It is the largest fjord in Severnaya Zemlya. Vollosovich Island and Blizhny Island lie off the mouth of the fjord to the west and to the east respectively.

At its inner end there are three branches converging into the fjord, all with active glaciers stemming from the Rusanov Glacier in the northwest and the enormous Karpinsky Glacier in the southeast, producing a great amount of icebergs. The constant outpouring of the glaciers at the head results in massive amounts of ice streaming out of the fjord.

Ecology
Matusevich Fjord is part of the Northern Nature Reserve, one of the seven subdivisions of the Great Arctic State Nature Reserve. There are numerous bird colonies in the cliffs of the fjord, including thick-billed murres (Uria lomvia), gulls (Larus hyperboreus) and snow buntings (Plectrophenax nivalis), among others.

See also
List of fjords of Russia

References

External links
Eurasian Arctic Tectonics - DiVA
New geochronological data on Palaeozoic igneous activity and deformation in the Severnaya Zemlya Archipelago, Russia, and implications for the development of the Eurasian Arctic margin, Geological Magazine
Arctic - Bird Observations in Severnaya Zemlya, Siberia

Fjords of Severnaya Zemlya
Bodies of water of the Laptev Sea